Sofya Andreyevna Arzhakovskaya (born 12 August 1987), known professionally as Sofya Skya is a Russian actress, ballet dancer and acting coach.

Early life
Skya was born in Leningrad, Russian SFSR, Soviet Union (now Saint Petersburg, Russia). Her grandmother, Emma Shchetinina, was a famous harpist and teacher, while her grandfather, Mark Fliderman, was a concertmaster of The State Academic Symphony Orchestra of Russia.

Skya began attending dance classes at a young age, and when she turned nine, she enrolled at the Vaganova Academy of Russian Ballet. At the age of twelve, she moved to Ufa for further training in ballet. She graduated from The Bashkir Choreographic College. As a principal dancer, Skya performed solo in such ballets as Swan Lake, La Bayadère, Snow White, La Esmeralda, and Raymonda at the Bashkortostan State Opera and Ballet Theatre.

Skya won numerous beauty contests. In 2005, she opened the third Vienna Opera Ball charity event in Moscow and won the "Russian Grace" contest. In 2006, she won the "Mrs World" pageant in Saint Petersburg.

In 2015, she had a little boy.

Career

In 2008, Sofya Skya attended a professional acting course at Baron Brown Studio in Los Angeles with Lisa Melillo . And have also worked  with the famous Hollywood trainer Michelle Danner on boosting skills at Larry Moss Official Studio. 
       
In 2008, Skya appeared as a desperate mother in The Courageous Heart of Irena Sendler, directed by John Kent Harrison. In 2009 she landed her first leading role in The Tomb, a film based on Edgar Allan Poe's Ligeia, starring Wes Bentley and Eric Roberts.

Following her appearances in those films, she was invited to play roles in Limelight (2009) and in Shadows in Paradise (2010) alongside Mark Dacascos. Also in 2010, she appeared in a Russian comedy, Klub Schast'ya, which brought her fame in Russia.

In 2013, Skya played the lead role in the film, Assassins Run (another name is White Swan), directed by Robert Crombie, alongside Christian Slater and Cole Hauser. In June 2013, Skya led the opening ceremony of the 35th Moscow International Film Festival.

She also appeared in the American thriller, My Stepdaughter (2015); the drama, Opus of an Angel (2017), directed by Ali Zamani; and the British thriller, Welcome to Curiosity (2018).

In 2019, she starred in the historical drama film, Once There Was a War, alongside Ben Cross. The movie is about the 14-day war between Serbia and Bulgaria in 1885, and is directed by Bulgarian director Anri Kulev. Skya played a Russian physician named Countess Anastasia Golovina. In 2020, the film was shown at the 42nd Moscow International Film Festival in Russia within the framework of the special program "Russian Trace".

Other activities

In 2013, Skya performed a dance of tsaritsa Syuyumbike at the opening ceremony of the XXVII Summer Universiade in Kazan. She supports charity events, such as "Meet For Charity".

Filmography

References

External links

1987 births
Living people
Dancers from Saint Petersburg
Russian ballerinas
Russian film actresses
21st-century Russian actresses
Russian beauty pageant winners